Massachusetts House of Representatives' 2nd Franklin district in the United States is one of 160 legislative districts included in the lower house of the Massachusetts General Court. It covers parts of Franklin County, Hampshire County, and Worcester County. Independent Susannah Whipps of Athol has represented the district since 2015.

Towns represented
The district includes the following localities:
 Athol
 part of Belchertown
 Erving
 Gill
 New Salem
 Orange
 Petersham
 Phillipston
 Royalston
 Templeton
 Warwick
 Wendell

The current district geographic boundary overlaps with those of the Massachusetts Senate's 1st Hampden and Hampshire district, Hampshire, Franklin and Worcester district, and Worcester, Hampden, Hampshire and Middlesex district.

Former locales
The district previously covered:
 Greenfield, circa 1927 
 Leverett, circa 1872 
 Montague, circa 1872 
 Shutesbury, circa 1872 
 Sunderland, circa 1872

Elections results from statewide races

Representatives
 Wm. T. Clement, circa 1858 
 Stephen Bates, circa 1859 
 Franklin Levi Waters, circa 1888 
 George K. Pond, circa 1920 
 Walter Forbes Hurlburt, circa 1951 
 Edward Shortell, circa 1975 
 John Merrigan, circa 2002
 Christopher Donelan, 2003–2011
 Denise Andrews, January 5, 2011 – January 7, 2015
 Susannah Whipps, 2015-current

See also
 Massachusetts House of Representatives' 1st Franklin district
 List of Massachusetts House of Representatives elections
 List of Massachusetts General Courts
 List of former districts of the Massachusetts House of Representatives

Images
Portraits of legislators

References

External links
 Ballotpedia
  (State House district information based on U.S. Census Bureau's American Community Survey).
 League of Women Voters of Franklin County

House
Government of Franklin County, Massachusetts
Government of Hampshire County, Massachusetts
Government in Worcester County, Massachusetts